Bhatt Majra is the name of multiple places:
 Bhatt Majra, Fatehgarh Sahib
 Bhatt Majra, Patiala